Thomas Fleming House or Thomas W. Fleming House may refer to:

Thomas W. Fleming House (Flemingsburg, Kentucky), listed on the National Register of Historic Places in Fleming County, Kentucky
Thomas Fleming House (Sherborn, Massachusetts), listed on the NRHP in Massachusetts
Thomas W. Fleming House (Fairmont, West Virginia), listed on the National Register of Historic Places in Marion County, West Virginia

See also
Fleming House (disambiguation)